Lyapunov theorem may refer to:

 Lyapunov theory, a theorem related to the stability of solutions of differential equations near a point of equilibrium
 Lyapunov central limit theorem, variant of the central limit theorem
 Lyapunov vector-measure theorem, theorem in measure theory that the range of any real-valued, non-atomic vector measure is compact and convex
 Lyapunov–Malkin theorem, a mathematical theorem detailing nonlinear stability of systems

See also
 Aleksandr Lyapunov (1857-1918), Russian mathematician, mechanician and physicist
 Lyapunov equation, used in many branches of control theory, such as stability analysis and optimal control
 Lyapunov fractal, bifurcational fractals derived from an extension of the logistic map in which the degree of the growth of the population periodically switches between two values
 Lyapunov time, characteristic timescale on which a dynamical system is chaotic
 Probability theory, the branch of mathematics concerned with probability
 Dirichlet problem, the problem of finding a function which solves a specified partial differential equation in the interior of a given region that takes prescribed values on the boundary of the region